"So Much for Pretending" is a song co-written and recorded by American country music singer Bryan White.  It was released in June 1996 as the second single from his album Between Now and Forever.  The song was White's third No. 1 single – and with a pair of weeks on top (September 21–28, 1996), his only multi-week No. 1 – on  the Billboard Hot Country Singles & Tracks (now Hot Country Songs) chart.

White co-wrote the song with John Tirro and Derek George, the latter of whom was a former member of the band Pearl River.

Music video
The music video was directed by Jeffrey C. Phillips and premiered in mid-1996. 

The video is also noted for a cameo appearance by then-Texas Rangers first baseman Will Clark, who is seen walking with White down the tunnel at The Ballpark in Arlington.

Chart positions

Year-end charts

References

1996 singles
1996 songs
Bryan White songs
Songs written by Bryan White
Song recordings produced by Kyle Lehning
Song recordings produced by Billy Joe Walker Jr.
Asylum Records singles
Songs written by Derek George